Day Dreamin' Davey is an action-adventure game developed by Sculptured Software and published by HAL Laboratory for the North American Nintendo Entertainment System in June 1992.

Gameplay 

Day Dreamin' Davey is a role-playing action-adventure game with elements of puzzle-solving. The player controls Davey on a top-down perspective, moving up, down, left, and right on the screen.

It takes place on one day of Davey at school, which involves him going through seven daydreams of himself being in three historic locations: Ancient Greece, Dark Ages, and the Wild West, with stopovers in "Outer Worlds" such as Winterland, a quicksand area, and a "Cloud City" filled with strong Titans along the way. The levels contain mazes and dead-ends.

Throughout the game, Davey collects items garnered from roaming the level and defeating bosses, with the more powerful ones, including those that increase or drain Davey's life energy, more hidden or guarded by evil protectors. Among items that can decrease the life energy include peppermint found in the Old West and green apples in Greece.

He carries a main weapon triggered with the A button and secondary weapons and shields activated by pressing the B button; due to this, the player has to press A and B at the same time to jump, which is required for jumping over fences and rocks and attacking foes above ground. Some enemies can only be defeated with certain "special weapons", and it's up to the player to find clues about which weapons kill what enemies. Multiple weapons can be carried at a time, and the player can change them during level gameplay through a menu screen accessed by pressing select; the menu also shows items and special items that have been collected. The game can be continued with passwords.

Reception

Day Dreamin' Davey was released to little press coverage, with only a Nintendo Power guide for the first seven levels a year prior to the game's release and a mixed review published in Game Players; in it, Patrick Baggatta wrote that it had strategy-solving elements that made it interesting enough for young kids but also was too limited in locations used and was overly long to the point of turning an "original concept" "tiresome".

Mixed opinions continued in retrospective coverage of the game. In a review for Hardcore Gaming 101, Adrian Sandoval opined that despite "an imaginative high concept that allows for a variety of level settings and game mechanics," the "slapdash and sloppy" programming and design choices ruined it; these include the weapons not being cancelled if both A and B are pressed to jump, an awkward method of obtaining items from non-player characters, re-used stage layouts, and combat involving poor hit detection and unclear feedback. Andy Slaven, in his book the Video Game Bible, 1985–2002, opined the game consisted of "varied, yet boring levels", and Skyler Miller of AllGame wrote the game benefitted from a "cute" story with a like-able protagonist but suffered from "bland" gameplay consisting of "boring mazes", "generic enemies" and "poor controls".

In 2015, Paste ranked it the 16th best NES game to use the Zapper, where Garrett Martin labeled it a "decent little adventure". Something Awfuls review of the game, which ranked it -39/-50, was a parody involving a fake conversation between the writer and Davey, ending with Davey dying a bloody death.

Notes

References

Bibliography 
 
 

1992 video games
Action-adventure games
Ancient Greece in fiction
Fantasy video games
Greek underworld in popular culture
HAL Laboratory games
Nintendo Entertainment System games
Nintendo Entertainment System-only games
North America-exclusive video games
Panhistorical video games
Single-player video games
Top-down video games
Video games about dreams
Video games about time travel
Video games developed in the United States
Video games set in the Middle Ages
Video games set in Greece
Video games set in the United States
Western (genre) video games